Anoplognathus flavipennis is a species of beetle within the genus Anoplognathus.

Description
Anoplognathus flavipennis is distinguised by "dull pygidium setose, and short rounded mesoventral process" .

Range
This species is found from Southern Queensland down to northwest Sydney.

References

Beetles described in 1817
Scarabaeidae
Beetles of Australia